Castro Barros is a station on Line A of the Buenos Aires Metro.  The station was opened on 1 April 1914 as part of the extension of the line from Plaza Miserere to Río de Janeiro.

References

External links

Buenos Aires Underground stations
Railway stations opened in 1914
1914 establishments in Argentina